Miss Baja California Sur is a beauty pageant held in Baja California Sur, Mexico, that selects that state's representative for the national Miss Mexico Organization Program pageant.

Title holders

Beauty pageants in Mexico